Effigy is a 2003 album by Nomy Lamm. It combines accordion, layered vocals, sound effects, and electro-driven drum beats.  Lamm's official website states the creative purpose of the album was "to create a heartfelt goodbye to her hometown and its control over her." The album was produced as a full-length theatrical rock show in the summer of 2003. Lamm went on the road with and performed songs from the album.

References

External links
Allmusic listing and overview
 Allmusic 
Chicago Reader 
 Portland Mercury

2002 albums
Nomy Lamm albums